American Zoetrope (also known as Omni Zoetrope from 1977 to 1980 and Zoetrope Studios from 1980 until 1990) is a privately run American film production company, centered in San Francisco, California and founded by Francis Ford Coppola and George Lucas.

Opened on December 12, 1969, the studio has produced not only the films of Coppola (including Apocalypse Now, Bram Stoker's Dracula and Tetro), but also George Lucas's pre-Star Wars film (THX 1138), as well as many others by avant-garde directors such as Jean-Luc Godard, Akira Kurosawa, Wim Wenders and Godfrey Reggio. American Zoetrope was an early adopter of digital filmmaking, including some of the earliest uses of HDTV.

Four films produced by American Zoetrope are included in the American Film Institute's Top 100 Films. American Zoetrope-produced films have received 15 Academy Awards and 68 nominations.

Formation
Initially located in a warehouse at 827 Folsom Street on the second floor of The Automatt building, the company's headquarters have, since 1972, been in the historic Sentinel Building, at 916 Kearny Street in San Francisco's North Beach neighborhood.

Coppola named the studio after a zoetrope he was given in the late 1960s by the filmmaker and collector of early film devices, Mogens Skot-Hansen. "Zoetrope" is also the name by which Coppola's quarterly fiction magazine, Zoetrope: All-Story, is often known.

In 1980, the company bought General Service Studios in Hollywood, California, and became Zoetrope Studios, to produce and distribute films, as did later DreamWorks studio.

In 1999, it signed a deal with Metro-Goldwyn-Mayer for a first-look financing and production agreement. In 2000, it signed a 10-year financing pact with VCL Film + Meiden to handle foreign sales of their own titles.

American Zoetrope is now owned entirely by Coppola's son and daughter, directors Roman Coppola and Sofia Coppola, while a majority of the film library is now owned by Lionsgate (with some exceptions, for example, Bram Stoker's Dracula, which is currently owned by Sony Pictures Entertainment) while StudioCanal owns international distribution rights.

Zoetrope.com, the Coppola family's website, was created around 1996 and became an online community for writers. In 2016, Francis Ford Coppola announced its relaunch as a "virtual studio".

Filmography

Feature films 
{| class="wikitable sortable"
|-
! scope="col" | Year
! scope="col" | Title
! scope="col" | Director
! scope="col" style="width:110px;" | Company
! scope="col" | Credit
! scope="col" | References
|-
|||The Rain People||Francis Ford Coppola|| rowspan="8" |American Zoetrope|| rowspan="3" |Production company||
|-
|||THX 1138||George Lucas||
|-
| rowspan="2" |||The Godfather||Francis Ford Coppola||
|-
|Ludwig: Requiem for a Virgin King||Hans-Jürgen Syberberg||Distributor||
|-
|||American Graffiti||George Lucas|| rowspan="2" |Production company||
|-
| rowspan="2" |||The Conversation||Francis Ford Coppola||
|-
|The Godfather Part II||Francis Ford Coppola||Production facilities furnished through (as American Zoetrope San Francisco)||
|-
| rowspan="2" |||Perfumed Nightmare||Kidlat Tahimik||Distributor||
|-
|Hitler: A Film from Germany||Hans-Jürgen Syberberg|| rowspan="3" |Omni Zoetrope||Distributor||
|-
| rowspan="2" |||Apocalypse Now||Francis Ford Coppola|| rowspan="2" |Production company||
|-
|The Black Stallion||Carroll Ballard||
|-
| rowspan="2" |||Sauve qui peut (la vie)||Jean-Luc Godard|| rowspan="23" |Zoetrope Studios||Production company/distributor||
|-
|Kagemusha||Akira Kurosawa||Production company||
|-
| rowspan="8" |||Parsifal||Hans-Jürgen Syberberg||Distributor||
|-
|The Escape Artist||Caleb Deschanel||Production company||
|-
|Passion||Jean-Luc Godard||Production company/distributor||
|-
|The Grey Fox||Phillip Borsos|| rowspan="4" |Production company||
|-
|Koyaanisqatsi||Godfrey Reggio||
|-
|The Making of 'One from the Heart'''||Tony St. John||
|-
|Hammett||Wim Wenders||
|-
|One from the Heart||Francis Ford Coppola||Production company/distributor||
|-
| rowspan="3" |||The Outsiders||Francis Ford Coppola|| rowspan="23" |Production company||
|-
|Rumble Fish||Francis Ford Coppola||
|-
|The Black Stallion Returns||Robert Dalva||
|-
|||The Cotton Club||Francis Ford Coppola||
|-
| rowspan="2" |||Seven Minutes in Heaven||Linda Feferman||
|-
|Mishima: A Life in Four Chapters||Paul Schrader||
|-
|||Peggy Sue Got Married||Francis Ford Coppola||
|-
| rowspan="3" |||Tough Guys Don't Dance||Norman Mailer||
|-
|Gardens of Stone||Francis Ford Coppola||
|-
|Barfly||Barbet Schroeder||
|-
|||Tucker: The Man and His Dream||Francis Ford Coppola||
|-
|||Wait Until Spring, Bandini||Dominique Deruddere||
|-
|||The Godfather Part III||Francis Ford Coppola||
|-
|||Hearts of Darkness: A Filmmaker's Apocalypse||Fax Bahr, Eleanor Coppola, and George Hickenlooper|| rowspan="44" |American Zoetrope||
|-
| rowspan="2" |||Bram Stoker's Dracula||Francis Ford Coppola||
|-
|Wind||Carroll Ballard||
|-
|||The Secret Garden||Agnieszka Holland||
|-
| rowspan="2" |||Mary Shelley's Frankenstein||Kenneth Branagh||
|-
|Don Juan DeMarco||Jeremy Leven||
|-
| rowspan="2" |||Haunted||Lewis Gilbert||
|-
|My Family||Gregory Nava||
|-
|||Jack||Francis Ford Coppola||
|-
| rowspan="2" |||The Rainmaker||Francis Ford Coppola||
|-
|Buddy||Caroline Thompson||Production company (as An American Zoetrope Production)||
|-
| rowspan="4" |||The Florentine||Nick Stagliano
| rowspan="12" |Production company||
|-
|The Virgin Suicides||Sofia Coppola||
|-
|The Third Miracle||Agnieszka Holland||
|-
|Sleepy Hollow||Tim Burton||
|-
| rowspan="4" |||Jeepers Creepers|| Victor Salva ||
|-
|CQ||Roman Coppola||
|-
|No Such Thing||Hal Hartley||
|-
|Suriyothai||Chatrichalerm Yukol||
|-
| rowspan="2" |||Pumpkin||Anthony Abrams and Adam Larson Broder||
|-
|Assassination Tango||Robert Duvall||
|-
| rowspan="2" |||Lost in Translation||Sofia Coppola||
|-
|Jeepers Creepers 2||Victor Salva||
|-
|||Kinsey||Bill Condon||Production company (uncredited)||
|-
| rowspan="2" |||Marie Antoinette||Sofia Coppola|| rowspan="20" |Production company||
|-
|The Good Shepherd||Robert De Niro||
|-
|||Youth Without Youth||Francis Ford Coppola||
|-
|||Tetro||Francis Ford Coppola||
|-
|||Somewhere||Sofia Coppola||
|-
|||Twixt||Francis Ford Coppola||
|-
| rowspan="2" |||A Glimpse Inside the Mind of Charles Swan III||Roman Coppola||
|-
|On the Road||Walter Salles||
|-
| rowspan="2" |||Palo Alto||Gia Coppola||
|-
|The Bling Ring||Sofia Coppola||
|-
|||Life After Beth||Jeff Baena||
|-
| rowspan="2" |||A Very Murray Christmas||Sofia Coppola||
|-
|Last Days in the Desert||Rodrigo García||
|-
| rowspan="2" |||Paris Can Wait||Eleanor Coppola||
|-
|Joshy||Jeff Baena||
|-
|||The Beguiled||Sofia Coppola||
|-
| rowspan="2" |||Love Is Love Is Love||Eleanor Coppola||
|-
|On the Rocks||Sofia Coppola||
|-
| 2021 || Mainstream||Gia Coppola||
|-
| 2023 ||Fairyland||Andrew Durham||
|}

Television series

Cafe Zoetrope
In the building lobby, Coppola operates a small Italian café, Cafe Zoetrope, featuring Inglenook Estate wine and memorabilia from his films. Earlier, the building had been the location of Enrico Banducci's "hungry i" nightclub.

The neighborhood is well known for its cafes and its writers. Coppola wrote much of the screenplay for The Godfather'' in the nearby Caffe Trieste and Lawrence Ferlinghetti's City Lights Books is located up Columbus Avenue from the Sentinel Building.

Further reading 
 Davies, Tom S., "Impressive Failures: Mavericks of Film Authorship and the Impossibility of Success in Hollywood" (2017). City University of New York Academic Works.

References

External links
 

 
American companies established in 1969
Film production companies of the United States
Film distributors of the United States
Entertainment companies based in California
Companies based in San Francisco
Cinema of the San Francisco Bay Area
Francis Ford Coppola
George Lucas
North Beach, San Francisco
Mass media companies established in 1969
1969 establishments in California